The 1997 ATP Tour World Championships (also known for the doubles event as the Phoenix ATP Tour World Doubles Championship for sponsorship reasons) were tennis tournaments played on indoor hard courts for the singles event, and indoor carpet courts for the doubles event. It was the 28th edition of the year-end singles championships, the 24th edition of the year-end doubles championships, and both were part of the 1997 ATP Tour. The singles event took place at the EXPO 2000 Tennis Dome in Hanover, Germany, from November 11 through November 16, 1997, and the doubles event at the Hartford Civic Center in Hartford, Connecticut, United States, from November 17 through November 23, 1997.

Champions

Singles

 Pete Sampras defeated  Yevgeny Kafelnikov, 6–3, 6–2, 6–2
It was Pete Sampras' 8th title of the year, and his 51st overall. It was his 4th year-end championships title, and his 2nd consecutive one.

Doubles

 Rick Leach /  Jonathan Stark defeated  Mahesh Bhupathi /  Leander Paes, 6–3, 6–4, 7–6(7–3)

External links
Official website
Singles Finals draw
Doubles Finals draw

 
ATP Tour World Championships
1997
Tennis tournaments in Germany
Tennis tournaments in the United States
1997 in German tennis
1997 in American tennis
Sport in Hanover
Sports competitions in Hartford, Connecticut
Sports in Hartford, Connecticut
1997 in sports in Connecticut